Lisa Arce Zimmerman (born July 8, 1969, in Manhattan Beach, California) is a retired female beach volleyball player from the United States, who won the silver medal at the 1997 World Championships in Los Angeles, California, partnering with her former High School and college teammate Holly McPeak.

About
Standing at 5 feet 11 inches, Arce was a world champion volleyball player. She currently resides in Redondo Beach, California. Over the span of her career, she has won over $650,000. Until 2013, she was the girls' volleyball coach at Mira Costa High School.

Education
Arce obtained her degree in English from the University of California Berkeley where she also played volleyball and was a four-year starter and two-time All-Pacific 10 player. Arce ranks among the school's all-time leaders in digs, kills, attempts, and service aces.

Family
Arce has a brother name Rick who was also a former professional beach volleyball player. In March 2001, Arce married her husband Andrew Zimmerman and together they had two kids named Ella and Abby.

Awards
 1997-WPVA Best Blocker
 1997-WPVA Best Hitter
 1997-WPVA Most Aces
 1995-WPVA Most Improved Player
 1994-WPVA Rookie of the Year

References

1969 births
Living people
American women's beach volleyball players
Sportspeople from Manhattan Beach, California
20th-century American women
California Golden Bears women's volleyball players